Itihaas (translated as "History") is a  1987 Hindi film directed by Joshiy, it stars Raaj Kumar, Shabana Azmi, Anil Kapoor, Rati Agnihotri, Mohnish Behl, Suresh Oberoi and Danny Denzongpa. This film was a remake of the Malayalam film Ithihasam, directed by Joshiy himself in 1981.

Synopsis
Joginder Singh is an honest and dedicated Police Commissioner. He and his wife Sunaina have two sons, Vijay and Rakesh and a daughter Jyoti. One day, Rakesh arrests Kalicharan, henchman of underworld kingpin Alexander. He is disturbed when he learns of Kalicharan's release after his son's appeal. As if this was not enough, Alexander himself is trapped by police and the anger against Singh reaches its climax. Alexander goes free on bail and abducts and molests Jyoti. When Singh is informed by Kalicharan's son about the tragedy, he kills a man at the scene of tragedy thinking him to be responsible.

Cast
Raaj Kumar as Police Commissioner Joginder Singh
Shabana Azmi as Sunaina Singh
Anil Kapoor as Advocate Vijay Singh
Rati Agnihotri as Shobha
Mohnish Behl as Inspector Rakesh Singh
Suresh Oberoi as Kalicharan
Danny Denzongpa as Alexander
Iftekhar as Senior Police Officer
Dinesh Hingoo as Bihari 
Prema Narayan as Khursheed  
Leena Das as Dancer

Music
Lyrics: Anand Bakshi

External links
 

1980s Hindi-language films
Films scored by R. D. Burman
Hindi remakes of Malayalam films
Films directed by Joshiy